Tiago Alexandre Martins da Cruz Pereira (born 6 February 1990) is a Portuguese football player who plays as a forward for Malveira.

Club career
Born in Lisbon, Pereira spent most of his youth career with G.S. Loures, where he made his senior debut in the Lisbon Football Association's first district league in 2009–10. After a spell with G.S.R. Murteirense in the same competition in 2012, he entered the national leagues the following March with Padroense F.C. in the third tier.

After three games and a goal for Padroense, Pereira joined Segunda Liga club Atlético CP. He made his professional debut on 17 November 2013 in a 3–0 loss at Académico de Viseu as a half-time substitute for João Mário, and made one more appearance off the bench before returning to Loures, now in the third tier. He then had two seasons with Sport Benfica e Castelo Branco in the same division.

After playing 2016–17 with S.C.U. Torreense, Pereira dropped back to the district leagues with G.D. Peniche of the Leiria Football Association before signing with F.C. Alverca in the third tier in June 2018. In November that year, he switched to A.C. Malveira in his home district's league.

References

External links
Soccerway profile
ForaDeJogo profile

1990 births
Footballers from Lisbon
Living people
Portuguese footballers
Padroense F.C. players
Atlético Clube de Portugal players
Liga Portugal 2 players
Sport Benfica e Castelo Branco players
S.C.U. Torreense players
Association football forwards
G.D. Peniche players